David L. Gollaher was the founding President & CEO of the California Healthcare Institute (CHI), 1993–2014, from which he joined Gilead Sciences where, from 2014 to 2018, he headed worldwide Government Affairs and Policy. Subsequently, in early 2019, he moved to head policy and government affairs at Vir Biotechnology, an emerging growth company focused on infectious diseases. He retired from Vir in 2021. He was appointed Senior Fellow at the Leonard D. Schaeffer Center for Health Policy and Economics at the University of Southern California in 2018.

Gollaher is an historian of science and medicine, and public policy executive.  He completed undergraduate studies at University of California and received his masters and Ph.D. degrees from Harvard University. Subsequently, he was a fellow of Harvard's Houghton Library, the National Endowment for the Humanities and is a member of the Massachusetts Historical Society.  Gollaher's biographical study, Voice for the Mad: The Life of Dorothea Dix received the Organization of American Historians' 1996 Avery O. Craven Award. His 2000 study Circumcision: A History of the World's Most Controversial Surgery was the first full medical scholarly history of the subject.

In 1993, after several years as a member of the executive team at Scripps Clinic and Research Foundation, Gollaher worked with California biotechnology industry leaders to found CHI, a public policy research and advocacy organization that grew to represent more than 360 California academic institutions, biopharmaceutical companies, medical technology and professional firms. After he left CHI, the organization merged with BayBio to create the California Life Sciences Association (CLSA). In 2003, he was appointed to the California State Legislature's Stem Cell Advisory Panel, and to the U.S. Congressional Homeland Security Advisory Committee.  Gollaher has served on the Advisory Board of the J. David Gladstone Institutes, the California Council on Science and Technology, and the Board of Overseers for Scripps Research. In September 2018, he joined the board of Cidara Therapeutics CDTX, a biotechnology firm focused on infectious disease and oncology.. Outside life sciences, he was a co-founder and is board member of Vision Robotics Corporation, sharing patents in the field of autonomous robotic navigation.

Bibliography
California's Biomedical Industry: 2008 Report (CHI/PriceWaterhouseCoopers: 2008)
California Biomedical Industry Report: 2010 (CHI/BayBio/PwC)
Competitiveness and Regulation: The FDA and the Future of America's Biomedical Industry (CHI/Boston Consulting Group: February 2011)
Circumcision: A History of the World's Most Controversial Surgery (New York: Basic Books, 2000)
Das verletzte Geschlecht: Die Geschichte der Beschneidung (Berlin: Aufbau-Verlag, 2002)
Voice for the Mad: The Life of Dorothea Dix (New York: Free Press, 1995)
'The Paradox of Genetic Privacy,' New York Times January 7, 1998

Notes and references

External links
 California Healthcare Institute homepage
 California Council on Science and Technology homepage
 Cidara Therapeutics homepage
 Vision Robotics Corporation homepage
 Gilead Sciences homepage
 Vir Biotechnology homepage
 David Gollaher@davidgollaher

Harvard University alumni
Harvard University staff
Living people
1949 births
Scripps Research
21st-century American historians
American male non-fiction writers
American nonprofit chief executives
21st-century American male writers